In Canada, the Leader of the Opposition  in the Senate is the leader  of the largest party in the Senate not in government.

Even though the position's name is very similar to the Leader of the Opposition in the House of Commons (the Opposition House Leader), the Leader of the Opposition in the Senate's role is more analogous to the Leader of the Official Opposition because its holder is the leader of the party's Senate caucus. The responsibilities that, in the House of Commons, are done by the house leaders—including day-to-day scheduling of business—are undertaken in the Senate by Government and Opposition deputy leaders and Opposition whips.

Selection 

Since it is the House of Commons of Canada that determines what party(ies) form government, the size of party caucuses in the Senate bear no relation to which party forms the government side in the Senate and which party forms the opposition. Thus, the Leader of the Opposition in the Senate may lead more Senators than the Leader of the Government in the Senate. Since, normally senators have longer tenure than MPs, this is often the case immediately following a change in government, until the new prime minister can appoint more people from their party.

The Leader of the Opposition in the Senate is not necessarily from the same party as the opposition in the House of Commons. From 1993 until 2003 the Leader of the Opposition in the Senate was a Progressive Conservative despite the fact the Progressive Conservatives were not the Official Opposition in the House of Commons. The Official Opposition in the Commons; (Bloc Québécois, Reform, Canadian Alliance) did not have Senate representation.  This scenario repeated itself following the results of the 2011 election that saw the Liberal Party lose Official Opposition status in the House to the New Democratic Party — since the NDP has no representation in the Senate (and favours abolition of the chamber) the Liberals would form the Official Opposition in the Senate.

There are no set rules governing the manner in which the position is filled from within caucuses.  When the Conservative Party and its predecessor the Progressive Conservative party have been in opposition, the party's Senate caucus has historically elected its own leader, although as noted by John Williams in a 1956 book on the Conservative party it may choose to follow the wishes of the national leader.

Senator Jacques Flynn was unopposed in 1967 after being encouraged to seek the position by the then national leader Robert Stanfield.  However, Senators John Lynch Staunton in 1993 and Noël Kinsella in 2004 were elected by their colleagues over other contenders.  In a November 10, 2015 Canadian Press story, Senator Claude Carignan referenced his election to the position of Senate Opposition Leader. Senator Larry Smith was elected Senate Opposition Leader on March 28, 2017, defeating Senators Linda Frum and Stephen Greene in a vote of the Conservative Senate caucus. On November 5, 2019, Senator Don Plett was elected by the Conservative caucus over Senator David Wells.

The traditional practice of the Liberal party in opposition had been for their national leader to select their leader in the Senate.

On the morning of January 29, 2014, Justin Trudeau announced that Liberal Senators would no longer be members of the national Liberal caucus, and wrote to Senate Speaker Noël Kinsella to advise him that  "Senators, who were previously members of the Liberal National Parliamentary Caucus, are no longer members of this Caucus, and as such, are independent Senators."  (Debates of the Senate, January 29, 2014).

When the Senate met in the afternoon, the first order of business was a discussion of that status of the Liberal Senators, and that of their leader.

Senator Jim Cowan informed the Senate that the Liberal Senators remained Liberals, and that  "when we met this morning following Mr. Trudeau's announcement, my colleagues voted to confirm our leadership team. Accordingly, I will continue to serve as Leader of the Opposition in the Senate. Senator Fraser was similarly elected to serve as deputy leader, Senator Munson as our caucus whip and Senator Hubley as deputy whip. As well, Senator Mitchell will continue as chair of our caucus."  (Debates of the Senate, January 29, 2014).

Following a lengthy discussion, the Senate Speaker ruled that the Liberal Senators met the definition under the Senate rules of being a caucus of at least five Senators of the same political party, that the rules state that the Leader of the Opposition in the Senate is the head of the party other than the government party with the most Senators, and that "as has been indicated by Senator Cowan, he has been elected by his colleagues and, therefore, meets the definition of the Leader of the Opposition in the Senate."  (Debates of the Senate, January 29, 2014).

List of leaders of the opposition in the Senate

See also 

Representative of the Government in the Senate
Leader of the Opposition in the House of Commons (Canada)
Leader of the Opposition (Canada)

References 

Westminster system